Mukuku is a village in Kwilu Province of the Democratic Republic of the Congo.

Location

The Köppen climate classification is Aw : Tropical savanna, wet.

Historical note

In 1931 there were widespread disturbances in the Kwango District of Congo-Kasaï, which the Ministry of Colonies later attributed to new administrative structures, availability of Force Publique units and overreaction by administrators.
At Mukuku in August 1931 troops killed 56 people in a single encounter.
Word of the violence spread, and villagers fled before the columns reached them, leading to optimism among the authorities that the rebellion was calming down.

Notes

Sources

Populated places in Kwilu Province